This is a list of electoral results for the electoral district of Blackwood-Stirling in Western Australian state elections.

Members for Blackwood-Stirling

Election results

Elections in the 2000s

References

Western Australian state electoral results by district